"Crying My Heart Out Over You" is a song written by Lester Flatt, Earl Scruggs, Carl Butler, and Earl Sherry and was originally recorded by Flatt & Scruggs, which peaked at #21 on the country chart in 1960.

In December 1981, the song was recorded by American country music artist Ricky Skaggs as the third single from his album Waitin' for the Sun to Shine.  It was Skaggs' third country hit and the first of eleven number one hits on the country chart.  The single stayed at number one for one week and spent a total of thirteen weeks on the country chart.

Charts

Weekly charts

Year-end charts

References

1960 songs
1960 singles
1981 singles
Flatt and Scruggs songs
Ricky Skaggs songs
Song recordings produced by Ricky Skaggs
Columbia Records singles
Epic Records singles